Yasuhiro Kido (born December 25, 1982) is a Japanese kickboxer, currently competing in the super welterweight division of K-1.

A professional competitor since 2003, he is the 2008 K-1 World MAX Japan tournament winner and the 2017 K-1 Super Welterweight Grand Prix runner-up.<ref name="Yasuhiro Kido Wins K-1 World Max Japan '08">{{cite web
| url=http://www.k-1.co.jp/k-1gp/btop.htm
| title="Yasuhiro Kido Wins K-1 World Max Japan '08" | last=DiPietro
| first=Monty
| access-date=2008-02-03
| publisher=K-1 Grand Prix Website
}}</ref> He is the former Krush Super Welterweight champion, having held the title from 2012 until 2014.

Kickboxing career
Background
Yasuhiro Kido was born in Kanagawa, Japan on December 25, 1982. When he was a junior high school student, he belonged to a track and field athletics team, and was training in sprinting. After graduation, he saw K-1 on television and joined Taniyama gym.

After graduation of Ishida high school, Kido entered at faculty of Physical Education at Kokushikan University. At that time, he joined its kickboxing team.

In 2001, he won the title of University Kickboxing Federation (UKF) at welterweight. In 2002, he won the title of UKF again at middleweight. In 2003, he participated All Japan Shin-Karatedo Championship at middleweight. He won the 3rd place.

When he graduated university, he got license to be a teacher for junior high school and high school.

Early career
Kido made his professional debut against Tatsuro Irie at MAJKF "Explosion-3" on September 14, 2003. He won the fight by a second-round knockout. He would go on to amass a 5–0 record over the course of the next 13 months.

Kido was scheduled to face Koichi Kikuchi at R.I.S.E. "Dead or Alive Tournament '04" on October 31, 2004, in the quarterfinals of the super welterweight tournament. Kido lost the fight by a second-round knockout. He was knocked down with low kicks in both the first and second rounds, and was unable to stand up after the second low kick knockdown in the second round.

Kido was scheduled to face Tsurugi at Ikusa "YGZ04 Bird-Base" on March 12, 2005. He knocked Tsurugi down with a head kick at the very end of the first round. He continued pressuring in the second round, finally knocking Tsurugi out with a head kick at the 2:32 minute mark.

Kido was scheduled to face Yuya Yamamoto in the opening bout of K-1 World MAX 2005 World Tournament Open on May 4, 2005. Although Yamamoto entered the bout as the favorite, he had trouble dealing with Kido. In the last minute of the bout, Yamamoto managed to knock Kido down with a head kick. The automatic 10-8 round awarded to Yamamoto was reflected in the scorecards, as he won by unanimous decision, with scores of 29–28, 30-28 and 30–28.

Kido was scheduled to face Kenshi Toda at Ikusa GP -U60 Superstarz Tournament -Final Stage- on September 19, 2005. Kido combined lead leg middle and high kicks with knees and the second round, with Toda appearing unable to deal with them. Midway through the second round, Kido clinched Toda and landed several undefended knees, which forced his opponent's corner to throw in the towel.

Kido was scheduled to fight Hideki Mizutani in the quarterfinals of the RISE Welterweight Dead or Alive tournament, held at R.I.S.E. "Dead or Alive Tournament '05" on December 18, 2005. Although Kido appeared to be leading on the scorecards after the first two rounds, he lost by a come-from-behind head kick knockout, early on in the third round.

Kido was scheduled to face Zenmaru Hidari at W Capsule Vol.1 on January 28, 2006. He won the fight by unanimous decision, with scores of 30–28, 30-27 and 30–27.

MAJKF
Kido was scheduled to make his promotional debut with MAJKF against K.Lewis at MAJKF "Surpring 3rd" on April 29, 2006. The fight was ruled a majority draw after the first three rounds were contested, with one judge giving Kido a 30-29 scorecard. Lewis was awarded a unanimous decision, after an extra round was fought.

Kido was scheduled to face Matsuo Akamine at W Capsule on June 11, 2006. The fight was ruled a majority draw by technical decision, at the 2:11 minute mark of the second round. The two of them fought an immediate rematch at MAJKF "Surprising 6th" on August 6, 2006. Kido won the rematch by a third-round knockout, stopping Akamine with a head kick, 13 seconds into the round.

MAJKF Middleweight champion
Kido fought a rematch with K.Lewis for the vacant MAJKF Middleweight Championship at MAJKF "Surprising-8 MAJKF Festival All Title Matches" on December 3, 2006. Kido cut Lewis with an elbow in the fourth round, prompting the ringside doctor to stop the fight.

Kido made his return to K-1 at K-1 World MAX 2007 Japan Tournament on February 5, 2007, when he was scheduled to face Kenji Kawabata. Kido knocked Kawabata with a combination of a right straight and head kick in the first round. He continued pressuring after the fight resumed, knocking Kawabata with a right straight at the 2:26 minute mark.

Kido was scheduled to face Gōzō Mitsuyama at K-1 World MAX 2007 World Elite Showcase on April 4, 2007. He won the fight by unanimous decision, with scores of 30–28, 30-27 and 30–28.

Kido was scheduled to face Hiroki Shishido at MAJKF "Breakdown 5" on June 10, 2007. Kido appeared to be the physically more imposing competitor and won the fight by unanimous decision, with scores of 50–48, 49-47 and 50–47. He scored the sole knockdown of the fight in the second round, when he dropped Shishido with a knee.

Kido challenged the reigning M-1 Middleweight champion Shingo Garyu at M-1 "120th Anniversary of Japan-Thailand -Muay Thai Hearty Smiles-" on September 24, 2007. The second round proved to be Kido's most successful, as Kido managed to knock Garyu down with a right straight. Garyu was more successful in the other rounds and won the fight by unanimous decision, with two judges scoring the fight 49–48 in his favor, while the third judge awarded him a 49-47 scorecard.

Kido was scheduled to face Yasuhito Shirasu at MAJKF "Breakdown-8" on December 2, 2007. He won the fight by unanimous decision, with all three judges scoring the fight as 29–28 in his favor.

K-1 MAX
K-1 World MAX 2008
Kido participated in the K-1 World MAX 2008 Japan Tournament, held on February 2, 2008. He was scheduled to face Keiji Ozaki in the tournament quarterfinals. Kido won the fight by unanimous decision, with all three judges scoring the fight 30–28 in his favor. Advancing to the semifinals, Kido was scheduled to face Andy Ologun. He won the closely contested fight by unanimous decision, winning the third round on all three of the judges scorecards. Kido was scheduled to face Hayato in the tournament finals. He won the fight by a first-round knockout, dropping Hayato with a right straight, after both fighters knocked each other down.

Kido was scheduled to face Chi Bin Lim at K-1 World MAX 2008 World Championship Tournament Final 16 on April 9, 2008. He knocked Lim down with a knee strike 40 seconds into the first round. He was next scheduled to face Artur Kyshenko at K-1 World MAX 2008 World Championship Tournament Final 8 on July 7, 2008, with the winner earning his place in the 2008 K-1 MAX final tournament. Kyshenko won the fight by unanimous decision, with scores of 29–28, 30-28 and 30–28.

Although he was unable to earn his place in the tournament final, Kido was scheduled to face Albert Kraus in the tournament reserve fight, held at K-1 World MAX 2008 World Championship Tournament Final on October 1, 2008. He lost the fight by a second-round technical knockout.

K-1 World MAX 2009
Kido participated in the K-1 World MAX 2009 Japan Tournament, held on February 23, 2009. He was scheduled to face Hinata Watanabe in the tournament quarterfinals. Watanabe won the fight by unanimous decision. Kido nonetheless advanced to tournament semifinals, as Watanabe was unable to do so, and faced Taishin Kohiruimaki. Kohiruimaki won the fight by a second-round knockout.

Kido was scheduled to face Su Hwan Lee in the reserve of K-1 World MAX 2009 World Championship Tournament Final 16, held on April 21, 2009. He won the fight by unanimous decision. Kido next scheduled to fight Leroy Kaestner in the reserve fight of K-1 World MAX 2009 World Championship Tournament Final 8. He won the fight by a clear unanimous decision, with all three judges awarding him a 30－27 scorecard. His streak of fighting in reserve fights extended to K-1 World MAX 2009 World Championship Tournament Final as well, as he was scheduled to face Yoshihiro Sato. Sato won the fight by a second-round right hook knockout.

K-1 World MAX 2010
Kido was scheduled to face Ryuji in the quarterfinals of the K-1 World MAX 2010 -70kg Japan Tournament on March 27, 2010. Ryuji won the fight by majority decision, with scores of 29–28, 29-29 and 28–27. Ryuji knocked Kido down with a right straight in the first round, but appeared to slow down from the second round onward. Kido appeared close to getting a draw, but was deducted a point due to a low blow in the third round.

Kido was scheduled to face Vahid Roshani at K-1 World MAX 2010 -63kg Japan Tournament Final 16 on May 2, 2010. He lost the fight by unanimous decision.

BigBang
Kido was scheduled to make his BigBang debut against U-jung Kim at Big Bang 2 on July 31, 2010. He won the fight by a first-round knockout, stopping Kim with a head kick.

Kido was scheduled to fight a rematch with Shingo Garyu at Big Bang 3 on September 23, 2010. They previously fought at -1 "120th Anniversary of Japan-Thailand -Muay Thai Hearty Smiles-" on September 24, 2007, with Garyu winning by unanimous decision. Kido was more successful in the rematch, as he won the fight by unanimous decision, with all three judges scoring the bout 30–27 in his favor.

Kido was scheduled to face Takayoshi Kitayama at Big Bang 4 on February 5, 2011. Kido won the fight by a dominant unanimous decision, with scores of 29–28, 29-27 and 29–26. He was deducted a point in the second round, as he was holding Kitayama in the clinch while knocking him down with a knee strike.

Kido was scheduled to face Kazuki Hamazaki at Big Bang 5 on May 15, 2011. He thoroughly dominated Hamazaki and won the fight by a wide unanimous decision. Two of the judges scored the fight 30-26 for Kido, while the third judge scored the fight 30-24 for Kido.

Kido was scheduled to face Kenta Yamada in his return to K-1, in the quarterfinals of K-1 World MAX 2011 -70kg Japan Tournament Final on September 25, 2011. Kenta won the fight by unanimous decision.

Kido was scheduled to face Shintaro Matsukura at Big Bang 7 on December 11, 2011. He won the fight by a second-round spinning backfist knockout.

Kido was scheduled to face Man-Sun Baek at Big Bang 8 on February 25, 2012. Kido knocked Baek down twice in the first round, with a head kick and a right straight, before finally stopping him with a left straight at the 2:02 minute mark of the second round.

Krush Super Welterweight champion
Kido was scheduled to challenge the reigning Krush Super Welterweight champion Kenta Yamada at Krush.17 on March 17, 2012. The two of the fought once previously, in the quarterfinals of K-1 World MAX 2011 -70kg Japan Tournament Final, with Kenta winning by decision. Kido won the rematch by a second-round knockout.

K-1 World MAX 2012
Kido was scheduled to fight Xu Yan at K-1 World MAX 2012 World Championship Tournament Final 16 on May 27, 2012. He won the fight by a third-round knockout, which earned him a place in the quarterfinals of the 2012 K-1 World MAX tournament.

Kido fought twice before taking part in the MAX tournament. He first fought Yū Hirono at Big Bang 10 on September 2, 2012, and won the fight by unanimous decision, with all three judges awarding him a 30-29 scorecard. Kido next fought Ludovic Millet at Krush.23 on October 8, 2012, and won the fight by unanimous decision, with all three judges scoring the fight 30–26 in his favor.

Kido was scheduled to face Murthel Groenhart in the quarterfinals of the K-1 World MAX 2012 World Championship Tournament Final on December 15, 2012. Groenhart won the fight by a first-round knockout, stopping Kido at the 1:47 minute mark.

Title reign
Kido was scheduled to make the first defense of his Krush title against Takurō Moriya at Krush.26 on January 26, 2013. Kido won the fight by a second-round knockout.

Kido returned to BigBang for his next two bouts. He was first scheduled to face Asami Zaurus at Big Bang 12 on February 24, 2013. He won the fight by unanimous decision. Kido was afterwards scheduled to face Masoud Minaei at Big Bang 13 on June 2, 2013, with all three judges scoring the fight as 30-25 for Kido.

Kido was scheduled to make his second Krush title defense against Yutaru Yamauchi at Krush.30 on August 11, 2013. He won the fight by unanimous decision, with scores of 30–27, 30-27 and 30–28.

Kido was scheduled to face Andy Souwer at K-1 World MAX 2013 World Championship Tournament Final 16 on September 14, 2013. Souwer won the fight by unanimous decision. Kido was scheduled to fight Kuntap Weerasakreck at Big Bang 15 on December 1, 2013. He won the fight by split decision.

Kido was scheduled to fight Li Yankun for the WBKF −70 kg World championship at Big Bang 16 on February 23, 2014. He won the fight by a third-round technical knockout, stopping Yankun with a series of knees.

Kido was scheduled to make his third and final Krush title defense against Hiroki Nakajima at Krush.40 on April 15, 2014. He won the fight by unanimous decision, with scores of 29–28, 30-27 and 29–28. Kido scored the sole knockdown of the fight in the first round, dropping Nakajima with a right hook.

Kido vacated the Krush Super Welterweight title on the title on August 21, 2014.

ISKA Super Welterweight title fights
Kido was scheduled to face the two-time K-1 World MAX tournament winner Andy Souwer at RISE 100 - Blade 0 on July 12, 2014. Souwer won the fight by unanimous decision, after an extra round was fought.

Kido was scheduled to face Samo Petje at Blade 1 on December 29, 2014. He lost the fight by unanimous decision.

Kido was scheduled to defend his WBKF −70 kg World title against Vahid Roshani at Big Bang 20 on February 15, 2015. He won the fight by unanimous decision, with scores of 30–27, 29-26 and 30–27.

Kido was scheduled to challenge the reigning ISKA Super Welterweight champion Armen Petrosyan at Oktagon 2015: 20 Years Edition on April 21, 2015. He lost the fight by split decision. Petrosyan and Kido were scheduled to fight an immediate rematch at Blade FC 2 on August 1, 2015. Petrosyan won the fight by unanimous decision, with all three judges scoring the bout 48-47 for him.

Kido was scheduled to face Zhao Shuai at Kickboxing of the world on January 23, 2016. He won the fight by a second-round head kick knockout.

K-1
Return to K-1
Kido signed back on with K-1 in early 2016, after K-1 had reformed following its bankruptcy. Kido was scheduled to face Daiki Watabe at K-1 World GP 2016 -65kg World Tournament on June 24, 2016. He won the fight by unanimous decision, with scores of 30–27, 30–27, 29–27.

Kido was scheduled to face the WKA Romanian Welterweight champion Robert Stoica at Big Bang 26 on September 4, 2016. He won the fight by unanimous decision.

Kido was scheduled to face Sanny Dahlbeck at K-1 World GP 2016 Featherweight Championship Tournament on November 3, 2016. He lost the fight by a first-round knockout. Kido later protested that he was illegally clinched preceding the knockout, but his complaint wasn't accepted.

Kido was scheduled to face Kim Min-su at Big Bang 28 on February 12, 2017. He won the fight by a second-round technical knockout. The victory was awarded to him, after he had successfully knocked Kim down three times in just over a minute and a half. All three knockdowns came as a result of a head kick.

K-1 Super Welterweight Grand Prix
Kido participated in the 2017 Super Welterweight World Grand Pix, held at K-1 World GP 2017 Super Middleweight Championship Tournament on June 18, 2017. Kido was scheduled to face Luke Whelan in the tournament quarterfinals. He won the fight by a third-round body shot knockout. The knockout was preceded by a second-round knockdown, due to a knee strike to the belly of Whelan.

He advanced to the tournament semifinals, where Kido fought a rematch with Sanny Dahlbeck. They fought just seven months prior, with Dahlbeck winning by a first-round knockout. Kido was more successful in the rematch and won by a first-round knockout, due to lowkicks.

Kido faced the two-weight WAKO World champion Chingiz Allazov in the tournament finals. Allazov won the fight by unanimous decision, with all three judges scoring the fight 28–25 in his favor. Kido was knocked down once in the first round, with a left hook, and twice in the third round, with a left and right straights respectively.

Drop down to welterweight
Following his loss to Allazov, Kido dropped down to welterweight, a 2.5 kg decrease in weight compared to his previous fights. In his first fight in a new weight-class, Kido was scheduled to face Minoru Kimura at K-1 World GP 2017 Heavyweight Championship Tournament on November 23, 2017. Kimura won the fight by unanimous decision, with all three judges awarding him a 30-25 scorecard. Kido was knocked down once in both the second and third rounds.

Kido was scheduled to face Issam Chahid at K-1 World GP 2018: K'FESTA.1 on March 21, 2018. He won the fight by unanimous decision, with scores of 30–27, 30-28 and 30–28.

Kido was scheduled to face Massaro Glunder at K-1 World GP 2018: 2nd Featherweight Championship Tournament on June 17, 2018. He won the fight by disqualification, as Glunder was disqualified for excessive holding, despite numerous warnings from the referee.

Kido was scheduled to face Jonathan Tuhu at K-1 World GP 2018: 3rd Super Lightweight Championship Tournament on November 3, 2018. He won the fight by unanimous decision. During the post-fight interview, Kido called for a title fight with the reigning K-1 Welterweight champion Yuta Kubo.

As Kubo acquiesced to a match, the title fight between the two was scheduled for K-1 World GP 2019: K'FESTA 2 on March 10, 2019. The fight was ruled a majority draw after the first three rounds, with two judges scoring the fight 30-30, while the third judge scored it 30-29 for Kubo. Kubo was awarded a split decision, after an extra round was fought.

Return to super welterweight
Following his loss to Kubo, Kido returned to super welterweight (-70 kg). He was scheduled to face Antonio Gomez at K-1 World GP 2019: Japan vs World 5 vs 5 & Special Superfight in Osaka on August 24, 2019. Kido won the fight by a second-round head kick knockout.

Kido was scheduled to face Katsuya Jinbo at K-1 World GP 2019 Yokohamatsuri on November 24, 2019. He won the fight by a second-round knockout.

Kido took part in the 2020 K-1 Super Welterweight World Grand Prix, held at K-1: K'Festa 3 on March 22, 2020. He was scheduled to face Milan Pales in the tournament quarterfinals. He won the fight by a second-round knockout, dropping Pales with a head kick. He advanced to the tournament semifinals, where he faced Hiromi Wajima. Wajima won the fight by unanimous decision.

Kido was scheduled to face Daiki Watabe during BigBang's 10th Year Anniversary event, held on November 8, 2020. He won the fight by majority decision, with scores of 29-29, 30-29 and 29–28.

Kido was scheduled to face Daiki Matsushita at K-1: K'Festa 4 on January 24, 2021. The event was later rescheduled for March 31, 2021. won the fight by a second-round technical knockout.

Kido was scheduled to fight a rematch with Yutaro Yamauchi at K-1 World GP 2021: Yokohamatsuri on September 20, 2021. The two of them previously fought at Krush.30, when Kido won by unanimous decision. Kido won the fight by a second-round technical-knockout.

Kido faced Yasuhito Shirasu at Bigbang 42 on June 12, 2022. The bout was a rematch of their December 2, 2007 fight, which Kido won by majority decision. He won the rematch by majority decision as well.

Kido faced Joji at Super Bigbang 2022 on November 13, 2022. He won the fight by a second-round knockout.

On December 16, 2022, it was announced that Kido would depart from K-1, as his contract with the promotion expired.

Post K-1 career
Kido faced Yukimitsu Takahashi at the inaugural Narigari show on February 5, 2023. The fight was ruled a decision draw after the first and only round of the bout was contested.

Championships and accomplishments
Amateur
2001 University Kickboxing Federation Welterweight champion
2002 University Kickboxing Federation Welterweight champion
2003 Shin Karate 14th All Japan K-2 Tournament Middleweight 3rd place

Professional
K-1
 2008 K-1 World MAX Japan Tournament Winner
 2017 K-1 World GP 2017 Super Middleweight Championship Tournament runner-Up
Krush
 2012 Krush Super Welterweight champion 
World Bars Kickboxing Federation
 2014 WBKF -70 kg World Champion (one defense)

Awards
2007 MAJKF MVP 
2007 efight Fight of the Year (vs. Hiroki Shishido, Martial arts Japan Kickboxing Federation, January 14, 2008)

Kickboxing record

|-  style="text-align:center; background:#c5d2ea;"
| 2023-02-05 || Draw || align=left| Yukimitsu Takahashi || NARIAGARI || Tokyo, Japan || Decision  || 1 || 3:00 ||55–24–2
|-  style="text-align:center; background:#cfc;"
| 2022-11-13 ||Win || align=left| Joji ||  Super Bigbang 2022|| Tokyo, Japan || KO (Punches) || 2 || 2:25 ||55–24–1
|-  style="background:#cfc;"
| 2022-06-12 || Win ||align=left| Yasuhito Shirasu || Bigbang 42 || Tokyo, Japan || Decision (Majority) || 3 || 3:00 ||54–24–1
|-  style="background:#cfc;"
| 2021-09-20 || Win ||align=left| Yutaro Yamauchi || K-1 World GP 2021: Yokohamatsuri || Yokohama, Japan || KO (Punches)  || 2 || 2:25 ||53–24–1
|-  style="background:#cfc;"
| 2021-03-28|| Win ||align=left| Daiki Matsushita || K-1 World GP 2021: K'Festa 4 Day.2 || Tokyo, Japan || KO (Punches) || 2 || 2:47 || 52–24–1
|-  style="background:#cfc;"
| 2020-11-08 || Win|| align=left| Daisuke Fujimura || Super Bigbang 2020 - Bigbang 10th Year Anniversary || Yokohama, Japan || Decision (Majority) || 3 || 3:00 || 51–24–1
|-  style="background:#fbb;"
| 2020-03-22|| Loss ||align=left| Hiromi Wajima || K-1: K'Festa 3 -70 kg Tournament Semi Finals || Saitama, Japan || Decision (Unanimous) || 3|| 3:00|| 50–24–1
|-  style="background:#cfc;"
| 2020-03-22|| Win ||align=left| Milan Pales || K-1: K'Festa 3 -70 kg Tournament Quarter Finals || Saitama, Japan || KO (Left High Kick) || 2||1:54 || 50–23–1
|-  style="background:#cfc;"
| 2019-11-24 || Win|| align=left| Katsuya Jinbo || K-1 World GP 2019 Yokohamatsuri || Yokohama, Japan || KO (Punches) || 2 || 2:29 || 49–23–1
|-
|- style="background:#CCFFCC;"
| 2019-08-24|| Win ||align=left| Antonio Gomez || K-1 World GP 2019: Japan vs World 5 vs 5 & Special Superfight in Osaka  || Osaka, Japan || KO (Left High Kick)|| 2 || 1:48|| 48–23–1
|-
|-  bgcolor="#FFBBBB"
| 2019-03-10|| Loss||align=left| Yuta Kubo || K-1 World GP 2019: K'FESTA 2 || Saitama, Japan || Ex.R Decision (Split) || 4 || 3:00|| 47–23–1
|-
! style=background:white colspan=9 |
|- 
|-  bgcolor="#CCFFCC"
| 2018-11-03 || Win || align=left| Jonathan Tuhu || K-1 World GP 2018: 3rd Super Lightweight Championship Tournament || Saitama, Japan || Decision (Unanimous) || 3 || 3:00 || 47–22–1
|-  bgcolor="#CCFFCC"
| 2018-06-17 || Win || align=left| Massaro Glunder || K-1 World GP 2018: 2nd Featherweight Championship Tournament  || Saitama, Japan || Disqualification  || 3 || 2:30 || 46–22–1
|-  bgcolor="#CCFFCC"
| 2018-03-21 || Win || align=left| Issam Chahid || K-1 World GP 2018: K'FESTA.1 || Saitama, Japan || Decision (Unanimous) || 3 || 3:00|| 45–22–1
|-  bgcolor="#FFBBBB"
| 2017-11-23|| Loss ||align=left| Minoru Kimura|| K-1 World GP 2017 Heavyweight Championship Tournament, Superfight || Japan || Decision (Unanimous) || 3 || 3:00|| 44–22–1
|-
|-  bgcolor="#FFBBBB"
| 2017-06-18 || Loss ||align=left| Chingiz Allazov || K-1 World GP 2017 Super Middleweight Championship Tournament, Final|| Tokyo, Japan || Decision (Unanimous) || 3 || 3:00 || 44–21–1
|-
! style=background:white colspan=9 |
|-
|-  bgcolor="#CCFFCC"
| 2017-06-18 || Win ||align=left| Sanny Dahlbeck || K-1 World GP 2017 Super Middleweight Championship Tournament Semi Finals|| Tokyo, Japan || KO (Low Kicks) || 1 || 2:28 || 44–20–1
|-
|-  bgcolor="#CCFFCC"
| 2017-06-18 || Win ||align=left| Luke Whelan || K-1 World GP 2017 Super Middleweight Championship Tournament, Quarter Finals|| Tokyo, Japan || KO (Left Middle Kick) || 3 || 1:33 || 43–20–1
|-  bgcolor="#CCFFCC"
| 2017-02-12 || Win ||align=left| Kim Min-su ||  Big Bang 28 || Tokyo, Japan || TKO (Three knockdowns) || 2 || 1:33 || 42–20–1
|-  bgcolor="#FFBBBB"
| 2016-11-03 || Loss ||align=left| Sanny Dahlbeck || K-1 World GP 2016 Featherweight Championship Tournament|| Tokyo, Japan || KO (Punch and Knee) || 1 || 2:09|| 41-20-1
|-
|-  bgcolor="#CCFFCC"
| 2016-09-04 || Win ||align=left| Robert Stoica || Big Bang 26 || Tokyo, Japan || Decision (Unanimous) || 3 || 3:00 || 41–19–1
|-  bgcolor="#CCFFCC"
| 2016-06-24 || Win ||align=left| Daiki Watabe || K-1 World GP 2016 -65kg World Tournament || Tokyo, Japan || Decision (unanimous) || 3 || 3:00 || 40–19–1
|-
|-  bgcolor="#CCFFCC"
| 2016-01-23 || Win ||align=left| Zhao Shuai || Kickboxing of the world || Hunan, China || KO (Left High Kick) || 2 ||  || 39–19–1
|-
|-  bgcolor="#FFBBBB"
| 2015-08-01 || Loss ||align=left| Armen Petrosyan  || Blade FC 2 || Tokyo, Japan || Decision || 5 || 3:00 || 38–19–1
|-
! style=background:white colspan=9 |
|-  bgcolor="#FFBBBB"
| 2015-04-21 || Loss ||align=left| Armen Petrosyan  || Oktagon 2015: 20 Years Edition || Milan, Italy || Decision (Split) || 5 || 3:00 || 38–18–1
|-
! style=background:white colspan=9 |
|-
|-  bgcolor="#CCFFCC"
| 2015-02-15 || Win ||align=left| Vahid Roshani  || Big Bang 20 || Tokyo, Japan || Decision (Unanimous) || 3 || 3:00 || 38–17–1
|-
! style=background:white colspan=9 |
|-  bgcolor="#FFBBBB"
| 2014-12-29 || Loss ||align=left| Samo Petje  || Blade 1 || Tokyo, Japan || Decision (Unanimous) || 3 || 3:00 || 37–17–1
|-
|-  bgcolor="#FFBBBB"
| 2014-07-12 || Loss ||align=left| Andy Souwer || RISE 100 - Blade 0 || Tokyo, Japan || Ext. R. Decision || 4 || 3:00 || 37–16–1
|-
|-  bgcolor="#CCFFCC"
| 2014-04-15 || Win ||align=left| Hiroki Nakajima || Krush.40 || Tokyo, Japan || Decision || 3 || 3:00 || 37–15–1 
|-
! style=background:white colspan=9 |
|-
|-  bgcolor="#CCFFCC"
| 2014-02-23 || Win ||align=left| Li Yankun || Big Bang 16 || Tokyo, Japan || TKO || 3 || 2:59 || 36–15–1
|-
! style=background:white colspan=9 |
|-  bgcolor="#CCFFCC"
| 2013-12-01 || Win ||align=left| Kuntap Weerasakreck || Big Bang 15 || Tokyo, Japan || Decision (Split) || 3 || 3:00 || 35–15–1
|-
|-  bgcolor="#FFBBBB"
| 2013-09-14 || Loss ||align=left| Andy Souwer || K-1 World MAX 2013 World Championship Tournament Final 16, First Round || Majorca, Spain || Decision (Unanimous) || 3 || 3:00 || 34–15–1 
|-
|-  bgcolor="#CCFFCC"
| 2013-08-11 || Win ||align=left| Yutaro Yamauchi || Krush.30 || Tokyo, Japan || Decision (Unanimous) || 3 || 3:00 || 34–14–1
|-
! style=background:white colspan=9 |
|-
|-  bgcolor="#CCFFCC"
| 2013-06-02 || Win ||align=left| Masoud Minaei || Big Bang 13 || Tokyo, Japan || Decision (Unanimous) || 3 || 3:00 || 33–14–1
|-
|-  bgcolor="#CCFFCC"
| 2013-02-24 || Win ||align=left| Asami Zaurus || Big Bang 12 || Tokyo, Japan || Decision (Unanimous) || 3 || 3:00 || 32–14–1
|-
|-  bgcolor="#CCFFCC"
| 2013-01-26 || Win ||align=left| Takurō Moriya || Krush.26 || Tokyo, Japan || KO (Spinning back fist) || 2 || 2:30 || 31–14–1
|-
! style=background:white colspan=9 |
|-
|-  bgcolor="#FFBBBB"
| 2012-12-15 || Loss ||align=left| Murthel Groenhart || K-1 World MAX 2012 World Championship Tournament Final, Quarter Finals || Athens, Greece || KO (Right high kick) || 1 || 1:47 || 30–14–1
|-
|-  bgcolor="#CCFFCC"
| 2012-10-08 || Win ||align=left| Ludovic Millet || Krush.23 || Tokyo, Japan || Decision (Unanimous) || 3 || 3:00 || 30–13–1
|-  bgcolor="#CCFFCC"
| 2012-09-02 || Win ||align=left| Yū Hirono || Big Bang 10 || Tokyo, Japan || Decision (Unanimous) || 3 || 3:00 || 29–13–1
|-  bgcolor="#CCFFCC"
| 2012-05-27 || Win ||align=left| Xu Yan || K-1 World MAX 2012 World Championship Tournament Final 16 || Madrid, Spain ||KO (Spinning Back Fist) || 3 ||  || 28–13–1
|-  bgcolor="#CCFFCC"
| 2012-03-17 || Win ||align=left| Kenta || Krush.17 || Tokyo, Japan ||KO (Spinning Back Fist) || 2 || 1:28 || 27–13–1
|-
! style=background:white colspan=9 |
|-
|-  bgcolor="#CCFFCC"
| 2012-02-25 || Win ||align=left| Man-Sun Baek || Big Bang 8 || Tokyo, Japan || KO (right hook) || 2 || 2:02 || 26–13–1
|-  bgcolor="#CCFFCC"
| 2011-12-11 || Win ||align=left| Shintaro Matsukura || Big Bang 7 || Tokyo, Japan || KO (Spinning backfist) || 2 || 2:24 || 25–13–1
|-  bgcolor="#FFBBBB"
| 2011-09-25 || Loss ||align=left| Kenta || K-1 World MAX 2011 -70kg Japan Tournament Final, Quarter finals || Osaka, Japan || Decision (Unanimous) || 3 || 3:00 || 24–13–1
|-  bgcolor="#CCFFCC"
| 2011-05-15 || Win ||align=left| Kzuki Hamazaki || Big Bang 5 || Tokyo, Japan || Decision (Unanimous) || 3 || 3:00 || 24–12–1
|-  bgcolor="#CCFFCC"
| 2011-02-05 || Win ||align=left| Takayoshi Kitayama || Big Bang 4 || Tokyo, Japan || Decision (Unanimous) || 3 || 3:00 || 23–12–1
|-  bgcolor="#CCFFCC"
| 2010-09-23 || Win ||align=left| Shingo Garyu || Big Bang 3 || Tokyo, Japan || Decision (Unanimous) || 3 || 3:00 || 22–12–1
|-  bgcolor="#CCFFCC"
| 2010-07-31 || Win ||align=left| U-jung Kim || Big Bang 2 || Tokyo, Japan || KO (Left high kick) || 1 || 1:35 || 21–12–1
|-  bgcolor="#FFBBBB"
| 2010-05-02 || Loss ||align=left| Vahid Roshani || K-1 World MAX 2010 -63kg Japan Tournament Final 16 || Tokyo, Japan || Decision (Unanimous) || 3 || 3:00 || 20–12–1
|-  bgcolor="#FFBBBB"
| 2010-03-27 || Loss ||align=left| Ryuji || K-1 World MAX 2010 -70kg Japan Tournament Quarterfinals || Saitama, Japan || Decision (Majority) || 3 || 3:00 || 20–11–1
|-  bgcolor="#FFBBBB"
| 2009-10-26 || Loss ||align=left| Yoshihiro Sato || K-1 World MAX 2009 World Championship Tournament Final Reserve fight || Yokohama, Japan || KO (Right hook) || 2 || 2:23 || 20–10–1
|-  bgcolor="#CCFFCC"
| 2009-07-13 || Win ||align=left| Leroy Kaestner || K-1 World MAX 2009 World Championship Tournament Final 8 Reserve fight || Tokyo, Japan || Decision (Unanimous) || 3 || 3:00 || 20–9–1
|-  bgcolor="#CCFFCC"
| 2009-04-21 || Win ||align=left| Su Hwan Lee || K-1 World MAX 2009 World Championship Tournament Final 16 Reserve fight || Fukuoka, Japan || Decision (Unanimous) || 3 || 3:00 || 19–9–1
|-  bgcolor="#FFBBBB"
| 2009-02-23 || Loss ||align=left| Taishin Kohiruimaki || K-1 World MAX 2009 Japan Tournament, Semi Finals || Tokyo, Japan || KO || 2 || 0:58 || 18–9–1
|-  bgcolor="#FFBBBB"
| 2009-02-23 || Loss ||align=left| Hinata Watanabe || K-1 World MAX 2009 Japan Tournament, Quarter Finals || Tokyo, Japan || Decision (Unanimous) || Ext. || 3:00 || 18–8–1
|-  bgcolor="#FFBBBB"
| 2008-10-01 || Loss ||align=left| Albert Kraus || K-1 World MAX 2008 World Championship Tournament Final Reserve fight || Tokyo, Japan || TKO (Doctor Stop) || 2 || 0:48 || 18–7–1
|-  bgcolor="#FFBBBB"
| 2008-07-07 || Loss ||align=left| Artur Kyshenko || K-1 World MAX 2008 World Championship Tournament Final 8 || Tokyo, Japan || Decision (Unanimous) || 3 || 3:00 || 18–6–1
|-  bgcolor="#CCFFCC"
| 2008-04-09 || Win ||align=left| Chi Bin Lim || K-1 World MAX 2008 World Championship Tournament Final 16 || Hiroshima, Japan || KO (Knee) || 1 || 0:40 || 18–5–1
|-  bgcolor="#CCFFCC"
| 2008-02-02 || Win ||align=left| Hayato || K-1 World MAX 2008 Japan Tournament, Final || Tokyo, Japan || KO (Punch) || 1 || 1:07 || 17–5–1
|-  bgcolor="#CCFFCC"
| 2008-02-02 || Win ||align=left| Andy Ologun || K-1 World MAX 2008 Japan Tournament, Semi Finals || Tokyo, Japan || Decision (Unanimous) || 3 || 3:00 || 16–5–1
|-  bgcolor="#CCFFCC"
| 2008-02-02 || Win ||align=left| Keiji Ozaki || K-1 World MAX 2008 Japan Tournament, Quarter Finals || Tokyo, Japan || Decision (Unanimous) || 3 || 3:00 || 15–5–1
|-  bgcolor="#CCFFCC"
| 2007-12-02 || Win ||align=left| Yasuhito Shirasu || MAJKF "Breakdown-8" || Tokyo, Japan || Decision (Majority) || 3 || 3:00 || 14–5–1
|-  bgcolor="#FFBBBB"
| 2007-09-24 || Loss ||align=left| Shingo Garyu || M-1 "120th Anniversary of Japan-Thailand -Muay Thai Hearty Smiles-" || Tokyo, Japan || Decision (Unanimous) || 5 || 3:00 || 13–5–1
|-
! style=background:white colspan=9 |
|-
|-  bgcolor="#CCFFCC"
| 2007-06-10 || Win ||align=left| Hiroki Shishido || MAJKF "Breakdown 5" || Tokyo, Japan || Decision (Unanimous) || 5 || 3:00 || 13–4–1
|-
! style=background:white colspan=9 |
|-
|-  bgcolor="#CCFFCC"
| 2007-04-04 || Win ||align=left| Gōzō Mitsuyama || K-1 World MAX 2007 World Elite Showcase || Yokohama, Japan || Decision (Unanimous) || 3 || 3:00 || 12–4–1
|-  bgcolor="#CCFFCC"
| 2007-02-05 || Win ||align=left| Kenji Kawabata || K-1 World MAX 2007 Japan Tournament || Tokyo, Japan || KO (Right cross) || 1 || 2:26 || 11–4–1
|-  bgcolor="#CCFFCC"
| 2006-12-03 || Win ||align=left| K.Lewis || MAJKF "Surprising-8 MAJKF Festival All Title Matches" || Tokyo, Japan || TKO (Doctor stoppage) || 4 || 1:44 || 10–4–1
|-
! style=background:white colspan=9 |
|-
|-  bgcolor="#CCFFCC"
| 2006-08-06 || Win ||align=left| Matsuo Akamine || MAJKF "Surprising 6th" || Tokyo, Japan || KO (Left high kick) || 3 || 0:13 || 9–4–1
|-  bgcolor="#c5d2ea"
| 2006-06-11 || Draw ||align=left| Matsuo Akamine || W Capsule || Tokyo, Japan || Decision(1–0) || 2 || 2:11 || 8–4–1
|-  bgcolor="#FFBBBB"
| 2006-04-29 || Loss ||align=left| K.Lewis || MAJKF "Surpring 3rd" || Tokyo, Japan || Decision (Unanimous) || 4(Ex.1) || 3:00 || 8–4
|-  bgcolor="#CCFFCC"
| 2006-01-28 || Win ||align=left| Zenmaru Hidari || W Capsule Vol.1 || Tokyo, Japan || Decision (Unanimous) || 3 || 3:00 || 8–3
|-  bgcolor="#FFBBBB"
| 2005-12-18 || Loss ||align=left| Hideki Mizutani || R.I.S.E. "Dead or Alive Tournament '05", Quarter-final || Tokyo, Japan || KO (Left high kick) || 3 || 0:48 || 7–3
|-  bgcolor="#CCFFCC"
| 2005-09-19 || Win ||align=left| Kenshi Toda || Ikusa GP -U60 Superstarz Tournament -Final Stage- || Tokyo, Japan || TKO (Towel thrown) || 2 || 1:30 || 7–2
|-  bgcolor="#FFBBBB"
| 2005-05-04 || Loss ||align=left| Yuya Yamamoto || K-1 World MAX 2005 World Tournament Open || Tokyo, Japan || Decision (Unanimous) || 3 || 3:00 || 6–2
|-  bgcolor="#CCFFCC"
| 2005-03-12 || Win ||align=left| Tsurugi || Ikusa "YGZ04 Bird-Base" || Tokyo, Japan || KO (Left high kick) || 2 || 2:32 || 6–1
|-  bgcolor="#FFBBBB"
| 2004-12-19 || Loss ||align=left| Koichi Kikuchi || R.I.S.E. "Dead or Alive Tournament '04", Quarter-final || Tokyo, Japan || KO (Left low kick) || 2 || 1:44 || 5–1
|-  bgcolor="#CCFFCC"
| 2004-10-31 || Win ||align=left| Tetsuya Yamauchi || R.I.S.E. X || Tokyo, Japan || Decision (Unanimous) || 3 || 3:00 || 5–0
|-  bgcolor="#CCFFCC"
| 2004-04-29 || Win ||align=left| Shinichiro Inoue || R.I.S.E. VII || Tokyo, Japan || Decision (Unanimous) || 3 || 3:00 || 4–0
|-  bgcolor="#CCFFCC"
| 2004-01-24 || Win ||align=left| Devil Arakawa || Ikusa "Future Fighter Ikusa 5 -Ran- Monkey Magic" || Tokyo, Japan || KO (Two knock downs) || 2 || 2:54 || 3–0
|-  bgcolor="#CCFFCC"
| 2003-11-16 || Win ||align=left| Hideto Yamabe || Ikusa "Young Gunners 2" || Tokyo, Japan || Decision (Unanimous) || 3 || 3:00 || 2–0
|-  bgcolor="#CCFFCC"
| 2003-09-14 || Win ||align=left| Tatsuro Irie || MAJKF "Explosion-3"  || Tokyo, Japan || KO (Punches) || 2 || 0:45 || 1–0
|-
| colspan=9 | Legend'':

See also
List of Krush champions
List of male kickboxers
List of K-1 Events

References

External links
Official K-1 website
Yasuhiro Kido K-1 profile

1982 births
Living people
Japanese male kickboxers
Welterweight kickboxers
Sportspeople from Kanagawa Prefecture
People from Isehara, Kanagawa